Amalija Pihajlić (born 4 July 1944) is a Serbian chess player who holds the FIDE title of Woman International Master (1977). She is a two-time winner of the Yugoslav Women's Chess Championship (1973, 1977).

Biography
In the 1980s Pihajlić was one of the leading Yugoslav women's chess players. She twice won the Yugoslav Women's Championship in 1973 and 1977. In 1977, she was awarded the FIDE Woman International Master (WIM) title. In 1982, Pihajlić participated at Women's World Chess Championship Interzonal Tournament in Tbilisi and ranked 12th place.

Pihajlić played for Yugoslavia in the Women's Chess Olympiads:
 In 1978, at third board in the 8th Chess Olympiad (women) in Buenos Aires (+6, =5, -2).

References

External links
 
 
 

1944 births
Living people
Sportspeople from Pančevo
Serbian female chess players
Yugoslav female chess players
Chess Woman International Masters
Chess Olympiad competitors